Dublin Civic Theatre opened in March 1999, a project of South Dublin County Council and also grant aided by the Department of Arts, Heritage, Gaeltacht and the Islands. The theatre has two performance spaces, the main auditorium and the Loose End studio.  

The smaller studio space is named the Loose End after the Civic’s location at the last stop of the Luas red line. The larger main auditorium can seat 282 people and the Loose End can seat up to 70 people.

External Links 
Civic Theatre Website

Concert halls in the Republic of Ireland
Music venues in Dublin (city)
Theatres in Dublin (city)